Hillaton is a community in the Canadian province of Nova Scotia, located in Kings County. Located near Canning, Nova Scotia, it was an important apple shipping location of the Cornwallis Valley Railway branchline of the Dominion Atlantic Railway.

References
  Hillaton on Destination Nova Scotia

Communities in Kings County, Nova Scotia
General Service Areas in Nova Scotia